Charles Stankievech (born 1978) is a Canadian artist, writer, publisher and curator.

Biography
As a result of the wide spectrum of strategies and the conceptual drive behind the production, his work has been located in the Conceptual Art tradition (e.g. the exhibition Conceptual Filiations ).

In 2007 he created and curated the Over The Wire project series that invites established artists to collaborate with students to produce new work under the restriction of long-distance communication.

Stankievech participated in the Canadian Forces Artists Program twice, in 2011 and 2015. His 2012 35mm film installation The Soniferous Æther of the Land Beyond the Land Beyond was shot at Canadian Forces Base (CFB) Alert and is part of a series of fieldworks he made that look at remote outpost architecture, military infrastructure, and the embedded landscape.

References

External links 
 
War Art in Canada: A Critical History by Laura Brandon, published by the Art Canada Institute
 Over The Wire website
 K. Verlag | Press website

1978 births
Canadian contemporary artists
Canadian experimental filmmakers
Canadian sculptors
Canadian male sculptors
Canadian video artists
Canadian installation artists
Canadian photographers
Canadian multimedia artists
Living people